
The Bishop of Kirkstall is an episcopal title used by a suffragan bishop of the Church of England Anglican Diocese of Leeds, in the Province of York, England. It is the suffragan see serving the episcopal area of Leeds, and takes its name from the Leeds suburb of Kirkstall, site of medieval Kirkstall Abbey.

History 

On 29 April 2015, the Diocese of Leeds announced that the See of Richmond would be revived for a suffragan bishop to assist the Bishop of Leeds in his area bishop duties. The title had remained in abeyance since 1921. Paul Slater was consecrated to the See of Richmond on 19 July.

Richmond had been an episcopal title used by a suffragan bishop of the Diocese of Ripon, in the Province of York. The title took its name after the town of Richmond in North Yorkshire. First bishop, John Pulleine, was originally created the suffragan Bishop of Penrith in 1888, but his title was changed the following year to Richmond.

On 14 March 2018, the name of the See was changed from Richmond to Kirkstall by Order in Council. The name is taken from a suburb of Leeds known for its ruined Cistercian monastery, Kirkstall Abbey.

List of bishops

See also

 Archdeacon of Richmond
 Roman Catholic Diocese of Richmond

References

External links
 Crockford's Clerical Directory – Listings

Diocese of Ripon
Anglican Diocese of Leeds